Vlastimil Hort (born 12 January 1944) is a German chess Grandmaster. During the 1960s and 1970s he was one of the world's strongest players and reached the 1977–78 Candidates Tournament for the World Chess Championship, but never qualified for a competition for the actual title.

Hort was born in Kladno, Czechoslovakia and was a citizen of Czechoslovakia for the first part of his chess career. He achieved the Grandmaster title in 1965. He won a number of major international tournaments (Hastings 1967–68, Skopje 1969, etc.) and national championships (1970, 1971, 1972, 1975, and 1977). He gained recognition as one of the strongest non-Soviet players in the world, which led to him representing the "World" team in the great "USSR vs. Rest of the World" match of 1970, where he occupied fourth board and had an undefeated +1 score against the Soviet Grandmaster Lev Polugaevsky—in some respects his greatest result. He defected to the West in 1985, moving to West Germany and winning the national championship of his new homeland in 1987, 1989, and 1991.

Chess career

Zonals and interzonals

Hort participated in a number of Zonal and Interzonal qualifying tournaments to select a challenger for the world title, generally with good results but without reaching the final stages of the Candidates process.

Sousse Interzonal 1967
The 1967 Interzonal tournament at Sousse included among its participants not only Hort, but also the great but volatile Bobby Fischer. While leading the tournament, Fischer was involved in a dispute with the tournament organizers regarding playing schedule that resulted in his forfeiting a game with the Soviet player Aivars Gipslis. While accounts of subsequent events differ, it is clear that he was persuaded to resume play, but then did not appear for his game with Hort, who was awarded a victory by forfeit. Negotiations with the organizers went downhill from this point, and Fischer withdrew from the tournament to begin his penultimate estrangement from grandmaster chess. Hort went on to finish the Interzonal in a tie for sixth with Samuel Reshevsky and Leonid Stein, but did not advance to the Candidates matches, Reshevsky becoming the successful Candidate following a three-way tie-breaking match.

Candidates matches 1977–78 
He reached the stage of the Candidates matches of 1977–78 but was eliminated in the first round, in a close match versus the former world champion Boris Spassky.

Hort's long-standing reputation as one of the great sportsmen of chess was enhanced by an event during this match. During the latter stages of the competition, Spassky fell ill and was unable to play. During Candidates matches, each player was allotted a fixed number of rest days to accommodate such situations, but Spassky exhausted his entire allocation of time-outs yet was still unable to compete. At this point Hort could have claimed the match won by forfeit; however, he offered Spassky one of his own time-outs so that the ex-champion could complete his recovery. Spassky did so and went on to win the match by the narrowest possible margin, eliminating Hort from that Candidates cycle.

In the penultimate game of the match Hort had established a clearly winning position, but forgot about the clock, and sat thinking until his time elapsed, handing the win to Spassky. With a draw in the next and final game, Spassky won the match. The following day Hort gave what was then a world record simultaneous exhibition in which he took on over 600 opponents. He explained that he gave the exhibition in order to get the loss against Spassky out of his head.

Olympiad career 
Hort played for Czechoslovakia in the Chess Olympiads of 1960, 1962, 1964, 1966, 1968, 1970, 1972, 1974, 1980, 1982, 1984, and for Germany in 1988, 1990, 1992.

Simultaneous play 
In 1985, he played a simultaneous exhibition against 636 opponents in Cologne, which earned him an entry in The Guinness Book of Records.

Later career
Hort has appeared numerous times as chess commentator alongside grandmaster Helmut Pfleger on German TV. Despite advancing age he has remained an active tournament competitor, representing the unified Germany and playing inter alia on "Veterans" teams in Scheveningen system matches against teams of Woman Grandmasters.  In 2006 he became Senior World Champion in Chess 960.

Notable games

The following is a game from the 1967 Zonal tournament (qualifying event for the Sousse Interzonal) held at Halle, East Germany that well illustrates Hort's capacity for converting a positional initiative into a winning attack. His opponent in this game, Dragoljub Minić, was a prominent Yugoslav International Master (later Grandmaster). Note that if Black captures the queen in the final position, White has an elegant mate with 29.Nf4+ Kh4 30.g3+

Hort vs. Minić, Halle 1967; King's Indian Defense (ECO E75) 1.d4 Nf6 2.c4 g6 3.Nc3 Bg7 4.e4 d6 5.Be2 0-0 6.Bg5 c5 7.d5 h6 8.Be3 Kh7 9.Nf3 Re8 10.0-0 Nbd7 11.Qc2 e6 12.dxe6 Rxe6 13.Rad1 Qe7 14.Rfe1 Nxe4 15.Nd5 Qd8 16.Bd3 f5 17.Nf4 Re8 18.Bxe4 Rxe4 19.Rxd6 Qc7 20.Rxg6 Rxf4 21.Bxf4 Qxf4 22.Rxg7+ Kxg7 23.Qc3+ Nf6 24.Re7+ Kg6 25.Ne5+ Kh5 26.Rg7 Be6 27.Qh3+ Qh4 28.Ng6

Notes

References

External links 

 
 Vlastimil Hort - I'm a chess entertainer (Chess24) 10 June 2014

1944 births
Living people
Chess grandmasters
Czech chess players
German chess players
German people of Czech descent
Sportspeople from Kladno
Chess Olympiad competitors
Czechoslovak defectors
Czechoslovak emigrants to Germany